Yulu is a technology-driven mobility platform, enabling integrated urban mobility across public and private modes of transport. It was founded in 2017 and headquartered in Bengaluru, India. Yulu operates in Bengaluru, Delhi, Gurugram, Mumbai, Pune, and Bhubaneswar with 18,000 single-seater vehicles across 2.5 million users. Yulu has raised $19.9 in million funding as of Feb 2021.

History 
Yulu was founded in 2017 by Amit Gupta, RK Misra, Hemant Gupta, and Naveen Dachuri.

In January 2018, the company began operations in Bangalore and Pune, followed by Mumbai and Bhubaneswar in the end of 2018. In September 2019, they expanded to New Delhi and by March 2020, they were in Ahmedabad, covering 6 major cities in a span of three years. 

In January 2019, Yulu launched a new fleet of 2,000 e-vehicles called the Miracle, followed by introducing its internet of things charging box which enables a cost-effective battery-swapping network. In November 2019, Yulu upgraded the Miracle by adding a bag holder, shock absorbers, and an improved footrest. In April 2020, Yulu launched 8,000 more Miracle e-vehicles with further improvements. In April 2020, due to the Coronavirus outbreak, Yulu introduced a ‘Last-sanitized’ timestamp to their app in order to assure utmost safety. In June 2020, Yulu introduced a 24/7 chat support to their app to improve customer support.

As of November 2020, Yulu has covered 27 million kilometres, helped burn 4 million calories and saved 2.3 million kilograms of carbon emissions.

Yulu’s main competitors are Bounce and Vogo. The difference is that their vehicles are proper, fuel-powered scooters that can be used for short distances or rented for the long term.

Usage 
Yulu connects micro mobility vehicles (MMVs) to users through an application, enabling first and last-mile seamless and sustainable connectivity. The technology-driven platform uses internet of things, machine learning, and artificial intelligence for demand-supply management and efficient operations.

The user installs the Yulu app from the Play Store or the App store and creates an account, followed by addition of money to the Yulu Money account using Google Pay, Paytm, PhonePe, BHIM UPI, credit card or debit card.

The Yulu app tracks and displays, via GPS, the vehicles available nearby or at any Yulu Zones around. Users can search for their destination/location and see the estimated time to reach the designated Yulu zone. The user scans the QR code given on the vehicle to begin the trip. To end the trip, the user parks their Yulu at a zone nearest to their destination, upon which, the cost of the trip is immediately deducted from the user's Yulu Money wallet. The Yulu platform works on a pay-per-use model.

Yulu Zones 
Yulu Zones are virtual docking stations, which have been strategically placed at populated locations across several cities where a user can access and park a Yulu vehicle. These Zones also provide space for Yulu Max charging stations.

Products

Yulu Move 
Yulu launched Move in 2018, a smart lock enabled bicycle that offered people an easy and healthy option for their short distance commutes.

Yulu Miracle 
Yulu started Miracle in February 2019, which is a micro, battery-powered vehicle that helps users commute longer distances at a maximum speed of 25 km per hour. The size and speed of the Miracle vehicle is below standard regulations, letting users ride it without a license or even a helmet (although Yulu recommends that users wear a helmet for their own safety), making the vehicle accessible and comfortable. The Yulu Miracle innovation aims to reduce traffic congestion and air pollution on the streets for a greener and healthier planet.

Yulu Max 
Yulu Max is a proprietary loT charging box installed at Yulu Zone clusters or independent shop owners offering a space to install. Every charging station has the capacity to charge 12 batteries. Yulu Miracle vehicles are parked at these stations and connected to the charging box where it is sustainably recharged or swapped with another battery.

Partnerships 
In May 2019, Uber partnered with Yulu to make urban commute efficient and eco-friendly. Yulu collaborated with Delhi Metro Rail Corporation (DMRC) to solve the complex problem of first and last-mile connectivity for commuters and to reduce congestion and pollution in the Delhi-NCR region in September 2019.

In November 2019, Yulu partnered with Bajaj Auto Limited to source electric two-wheelers, which have been co-designed and manufactured exclusively for shared micro-mobility. Bajaj Auto Limited invested $8 mn in Yulu. 

In early 2020, Yulu partnered with Mumbai Metropolitan Region Development Authority (MMRDA).

Yulu has partnerships with various local city authorities like the Bruhat Bengaluru Mahanagara Palike (BBMP), Directorate of Urban Land Transport (DULT), and Namma Metro (BMRCL), Capital Region Urban Transport (CRUT), and Pune Municipal Corporation (PMC). 

It also partners with co-living spaces like CoLive, RentMyStay, Zolo, and CoHo for commuting.

Recognition 

 Emerge 50 Award - NASSCOM (2020)
Innovation in Transportation Technology - Aegis Graham Bell Awards (2020)
TechTors: Most Disruptive Startup - Business World (2020)
Emerging Startup of the Year - Entrepreneur India (2019)
 Coolest Startup of the Year - Business Today (2019)
Startup of the Year - Business Connect (2019)
 Most Innovative Startup - Inc42 (2018)

References 

Bicycle sharing companies
Scooter sharing companies
Indian companies established in 2017
Transport companies established in 2017
2017 establishments in Karnataka
Companies based in Bangalore